The Grasshopper Company is headquartered in Moundridge, Kansas, United States. The company manufactures commercial & residential mowers, snow removal equipment, and ground care equipment.

History 
Grasshopper has been a family-owned business since 1969, when the first Grasshopper mower was introduced (invented by LeRoy Stucky, who also designed the trademark) and has expanded to include a  manufacturing facility in Moundridge.  The company developed their products to serve the needs of government entities, lawn care professionals and equipment owners.

Grasshopper innovations 
Grasshopper was the first manufacturer to offer dual swing-out levers for their zero-turn mowers (1973) and the first to offer a diesel-powered zero-turn mower (1983).

Grasshopper culture
Grasshopper was presented with a 2012 Pollution Prevention (P2) award from the Kansas Department of Health and Environment in August 2012. The company was selected for its investments in new laser cutting technology, software and parts scanning equipment that reduced consumption of raw steel at its manufacturing facility in Moundridge.

See also
Lawns in the United States

References 

Lawn mower manufacturers
Manufacturing companies based in Kansas
McPherson County, Kansas
Manufacturing companies established in 1969
1969 establishments in Kansas